Mahbod (in Persian مهبد) is a given name and surname. It may refer to: Mahbod Harandizadeh

Given name
Mahbod (envoy), 6th-century Iranian ambassador and military officer from the House of Suren
Mahbod Moghadam (born 1982), Iranian-American internet entrepreneur, co-founder of Everipedia
Mahbod Seraji, Iranian-American author and novelist

Surname
Samson Mahbod (born 1989), Canadian-American professional ice hockey player of Iranian descent